Robert Morse Crunden (December 23, 1940 - March 23, 1999) was an American historian. He was a professor of American studies and history at the University of Texas at Austin, and the author of many books.

Early life
Crunden was born on December 23, 1940 in Jersey City, New Jersey. He grew up in New Jersey and Nova Scotia, Canada. He attended Yale University, where William H. Goetzmann was one of his professors, and he graduated magna cum laude in 1962. He earned a PhD in History from Harvard University in 1967. His dissertation director was Frank Freidel.

Career
Crunden taught History and American Studies at the University of Texas at Austin from 1967 until his death in 1999. He was the director of the American Studies program from 1985 to 1990. He was awarded a Fulbright chair as the Bicentennial Professor of American Studies at the University of Helsinki in 1976-1977, and he was the director of the American Studies Research Center in Hyderabad, India from 1982 to 1984, also thanks to the Fulbright Program. He was awarded a Fulbright senior lectureship to teach at La Trobe University in Australia in 1978.

Crunden was the author of many books, including American Salons: Encounters with European Modernism, 1885-1917, which was translated into many languages.

Personal life and death
Crunden had three daughters. He died of a heart attack on March 23, 1999 in Austin, Texas.

Works

References

1940 births
1999 deaths
Yale University alumni
Harvard Graduate School of Arts and Sciences alumni
Writers from Jersey City, New Jersey
Fulbright Distinguished Chairs
University of Texas at Austin faculty
American expatriates in Canada
American expatriates in Australia
American expatriates in India
American expatriates in Finland
Historians from New Jersey